Merciless Man is a 1976 crime film directed by Mario Lanfranchi and starring Tony Lo Bianco.

Cast
 Tony Lo Bianco - The American
 Maud Adams - Marta Mayer
 Adolfo Celi - Lo Gallo
 Barbara Vittoria Calori (as Barbara Romana Calori)
 Howard Ross - Caleb
 Fiona Florence
 Luigi Bonos
 Yanti Somer - Mayer's henchwoman

References

External links

1976 films
1976 crime films
1970s Italian-language films
English-language Italian films
Films directed by Mario Lanfranchi
Films set in Genoa
Films scored by Franco Micalizzi
Poliziotteschi films
1970s Italian films